Karl Rose (born 12 October 1978) is an English former professional footballer who played as a striker. He is currently the chairman and manager of community club Wombwell Town who play in the Sheffield & Hallamshire County Senior Football League.

Playing career
Rose began his playing career in the Football League with Barnsley, where he was tipped to go to the top following several youth international honours. However following his initial break through into the first team his career was blighted by a serious knee injury resulting in over 20 operations. Following his release from Barnsley against medical advice Rose resurrected his career with brief spells at Mansfield and Rochdale before finally moving to Scarborough. During his spell at Scarborough under Russell Slade he became a fans favourite and was key part in the 2004 F.A cup run where he scored the winning against Doncaster Rovers which featured on BBC Match of the Day. The cup run ended when Premier League Chelsea knocked the sea Dogs out with a 1–0 win at the packed McCain stadium. He went on to play for Leigh RMI, Tamworth, Arnold Town, Garforth Town, Hednesford Town and Goole. In the summer of 2018 Karl Rose, with another former Barnsley player Doug O'Connor, formed Wombwell Town Football Club who play in the Sheffield County Senior League.

Managerial career
Whilst a player at the club Rose began his managerial career at Goole, where he spent three years as manager taking them to their highest finish for 12 seasons, before becoming manager of Frickley Athletic. Rose managed the South Emsall club for 5 seasons winning the Sheffield Senior cup on 4 occasions and leading them to the heights of a seventh-place finish, their highest since the mid 1980s. He was replaced by Lee Morris on 2 September 2016. Rose was resigned by Frickley Athletic on 27 March 2017, and left again on 9 May 2017. He left Goole at the end of the 2017–18 season.

As of the 2018/19 season, he is the chairman and manager of Wombwell Town F.C. a new club formed by Rose in 2018 and in their first season won Division Two of the Sheffield & Hallamshire County Senior Football League. The club consists of 13 junior teams as well as numerous other sporting activities at the Recreational Ground complex.

Community involvement
Karl Rose helped format the Wombwell Recreation ground committee that has been responsible for running numerous sporting lead community events. The facility has been used by over 10,000 participants in the last 3 years and become an integral part of the local residents life's. The facility has promoted and delivered events such as tournaments, summer festivals, bon fire celebrations and Christmas parties.

The site is also now used by South Yorkshire Police to training various aspects including dog handling and car pursuit training as well as numerous other non profit events linked to local charities such as non visual driving experiences around the go kart track for the visually impaired and men in shed age concern clubs to increase social gatherings in older age men.

Personal life
In December 2002, Rose was charged with raping an underage girl - a claim he denied. Rose was jailed for four months after admitting having sex with the girl. The court accepted that Rose did not know the girl was underage and told him she was 16.

References

External links

Hednesford Town Profile
Image

1978 births
Living people
Arnold Town F.C. players
Association football forwards
Barnsley F.C. players
National League (English football) players
English footballers
Garforth Town A.F.C. players
Hednesford Town F.C. players
Leigh Genesis F.C. players
Mansfield Town F.C. players
Footballers from Barnsley
Rochdale A.F.C. players
Scarborough F.C. players
Tamworth F.C. players
English Football League players
Goole A.F.C. players
Goole A.F.C. managers
English football managers
Frickley Athletic F.C. managers
British people convicted of sexual assault
English people convicted of child sexual abuse
Prisoners and detainees of England and Wales
Sportspeople convicted of crimes